Nigel Vonas is a film, television, and theatre actor, perhaps best known for his roles on Prison Break and Arrow. He completed his first year of computer engineering at the University of Toronto, before choosing arts over science.

Career
He began his acting career in theatre, starring in several renowned American plays. The performances include his award-winning portrayal of Mike Downey, in the critically acclaimed play, Cherry Docs, by David Gow.

His film and television career began on Stargate SG-1, and he has since appeared on several other American TV series.

Filmography

Film & Television

References

External links
 

Canadian male film actors
Canadian male television actors
Living people
Year of birth missing (living people)